Windhoff is a German manufacturer of specialised railways rolling stock, and heavy industrial plant. The company was founded in 1889.

The company is well known for its CargoSprinter rail vehicle, and derivatives.

History
By 1901 the company was employing over 100 people.

In 1913, these two private companies were combined to form the share-based  (Windhoff Machine Factory Rheine).  This combined company suffered losses during the 1930s.  Later, a bomb destroyed the manufacturing premises on 5 October 1944.  In 1957 the company stopped manufacturing normal locomotives and start to concentrate on tracking machines (ballast tampers).

The Windhoff company was first listed on the stock exchange in 1993.
On 19 December 2001, the main company was declared bankrupt and the industrial plant and railway engineering divisions being taken over on 1 March 2002, to become part of Georgsmarienhütte Holdings GmbH. The company is an approved railway contractor for in the United Kingdom, Sweden and Norway.

Products
Windhoff manufactures specialised rail vehicles including the diesel freight multiple unit the CargoSprinter, and the Windhoff MPV, used for infrastructure and service trains, as well as electric and diesel shunting machines, shunting locomotives, and stationary shunting equipment. The company also manufactures a wide variety of rail service equipment including lifting equipment, traversers and turntables and equipment for wheelset maintenance including wheel and bogie drop machines, and wheelset and bogie measuring equipment.

Windhoff has a contract to supply Network Rail with a factory train which will be used by Amey plc in the Great Western electrification project.

The company also manufactures equipment for heavy industrial plants, including steel-works equipment such as ladle transporters and tippers, torpedo wagons (in association with IAG-MAGNUM), and machinery for steel coil handling.

References

External links

, company website

Rolling stock manufacturers of Germany